Lopamudra was a female philosopher according to ancient Vedic Indian literature.

Lopamudra may also refer to:

 Lopamudra Bhattacharji (born 1960), Indian cricketer
 Lopamudra Mitra, Bengali singer
 Lopamudra Raut (born 1991), Indian model and actress
 Lopamudra, a 1930 novel by Kanaiyalal Maneklal Munshi